Eley v Positive Government Security Life Assurance Co Ltd (1876) 1 Ex D 88 is a UK company law case, concerning a company's articles of association as a contract between member and company.

Facts
Article 118 of the constitution of Positive Government Ltd stated ‘Mr William Eley of 27 New Broad Street, City of London, shall be the solicitor to the company…’. Eley in fact drafted the articles. But then the company never employed him as its solicitor. He was a member, but he brought an action to enforce the articles in his capacity as a solicitor.

The Exchequer Division held the articles did not create any contract between Eley and the company.

Judgment
In the Court of Appeal, Lord Cairns LC affirmed the decision and held, Mr Eley had the right to sue only in his capacity as member, not as solicitor. His brief judgment was as follows.

Lord Coleridge and Mellish LJ concurred.

See also

UK company law

Notes

References

United Kingdom company case law